Starwood Hotels & Resorts Worldwide is an American hotel and leisure company acquired by Marriott in 2016.

Starwood may also refer to:
 Starwood Amphitheatre, a former outdoor music venue in the Nashville, Tennessee area 
 Starwood (nightclub), a former music venue in West Hollywood, California
 Starwood Festival, an annual Neo-Pagan, New Age, multi-cultural and world music festival
 Starwood Capital Group, an American private investment firm